Pseudobactricia ridleyi, also known as Ridley's stick insect, is an extinct stick insect of the family Diapheromeridae. The species was endemic to Singapore. It is the only species in the genus Pseudobactricia.

References

Phasmatodea
Phasmatodea genera
Monotypic insect genera
Insects described in 1904
Endemic fauna of Singapore
Extinct insects since 1500
Insects of Singapore